International Hockey League may refer to:

 International Professional Hockey League (1904–1907), central-eastern North America
 International Hockey League (1929–1936), central-eastern North America
 International Hockey League (1945–2001), across North America
 International Hockey League (1992–1996), Eastern Europe, now the Kontinental Hockey League
 Interliga (1999–2007), or International Ice Hockey League, central-eastern Europe, replaced the Alpenliga
 International Hockey League (2007–2010), now the United Hockey League, midwest North America
 Inter-National League (2012–2016), Austria, Italy, and Slovenia

See also
 List of ice hockey leagues, professional and amateur leagues from around the world